The 2011–12 Etisalat Emirates Cup is the fourth season of the league cup competition for teams in the UAE Pro-League.

Group stage

Group A

Group B

Semi-finals

Final

External links
Emirates Cup tables and results at goalzz
Emirates Cup tables and results at Soccerway

UAE League Cup seasons
Etisalat Emirates Cup
2011–12 domestic association football cups